Juliana Josefa Benita Larena Fenollé (16 February 1790, Ejea de los Caballeros, Spain  1835, Zaragoza, Spain) was a nurse and hero of the Sieges of Zaragoza during the Peninsular War.

Larena moved to Zaragoza, Spain at a young age, and was 18 years old when General Lefebvre initiated the French army's first siege on the city in 1808. During the first siege, she worked as a nurse, tending to the wounded on the front line. During the second siege a year later, Larena helped to defend the stronghold located at Cathedral-Basilica of Our Lady of the Pillar, one of the most dangerous areas during the siege.

On 30 September 1808, General Palafox awarded her the Shield of Distinction for her bravery and provided her a pension, which King Ferdinand VII confirmed on 25 October 1814.

Larena died of cholera in 1835, in Zaragoza.

On the centenary of the first siege, a street in Zaragoza was renamed Calle Juliana Larena in her honor.

References

Spanish nurses
Women in war in Spain
19th-century Spanish women
History of Zaragoza
People of the Peninsular War
Female wartime nurses
1790 births
1835 deaths
Deaths from cholera